Dwarf lupine is a common name for several lupines and may refer to:

Lupinus caespitosus
Lupinus lepidus
Lupinus nanus
Lupinus pusillus

Several other species of lupines which are cultivated as ornamentals have low growing dwarf cultivars. Ornamental species with dwarf cultivars include:
Lupinus hartwegii
Lupinus polyphyllus